Ten United States presidents have made presidential visits to East Asia. The first presidential trip to a country in East Asia was made by Dwight D. Eisenhower (as president-elect) in 1952. Since then, all presidents, except John F. Kennedy, have traveled to one or more nations in the region while in office.

To date, 24 visits have been made to Japan, 20 to South Korea, 14 to China, and one each to Mongolia and to North Korea.

Table of visit

Gallery

Visits by former presidents
  Ulysses S. Grant visited Hong Kong, Canton (now Guangzhou), Shanghai, and Peking where he spoke with the head of government, Prince Gong, and Li Hongzhang, Viceroy of Zhili, in 1878, during a world tour after leaving office. He subsequently visited Japan, before returning to the U.S.
 Richard Nixon visited China at the personal invitation of Mao Zedong in February 1976. He visited again in mid–1979, and had a private meeting with Deng Xiaoping in Beijing.
 Jimmy Carter travelled to China, along with Carter Center personnel, for meetings with government and other officials on several occasions: July 1997, September 2003, December 2007, and January 2009. Additionally, Carter has visited North Korea twice: in June 1994 he meet with Kim Il Sung in Pyongyang to persuade Kim to negotiate with the Clinton Administration over its nuclear program; and, in August 2010 he met with Kim Jong-il in Pyongyang to secure the release of Aijalon Mahli Gomes, an American teacher who was imprisoned in North Korea for entering that country without a travel visa. Carter returned to the United States with Gomes.
 Bill Clinton travelled to North Korea in August 2009 to secure the release of two American journalists, Euna Lee and Laura Ling, who were imprisoned for illegally entering North Korea. He met with Kim Jong-il in Pyongyang, and returned to the United States with the journalists.

See also
 Foreign policy of the United States
 United States–South Korea free trade agreement
 Security Treaty Between the United States and Japan
 One-China policy

Notes

References

Lists of United States presidential visits
China–United States relations
Japan–United States relations
Mongolia–United States relations
South Korea–United States relations
Taiwan–United States relations
North Korea–United States relations